Hakim Abdul Hameed (1908 - 1999) was an Indian physician of the traditional medicine system of Unani, the founder chancellor of Jamia Hamdard, and a former chancellor of Aligarh Muslim University. His ancestors came from Kashgar (now Kashi, Xinjiang, China) to the Indian subcontinent, in the reign of the Mughal emperor, Shah Alam. He was the founder and chief trustee of Hamdard Laboratories. He was honoured by the Government of India in 1965, with the award of Padma Shri, the fourth highest Indian civilian award and in 1992, the government awarded him the third highest Indian honour of Padma Bhushan. He was the elder brother of the Hakeem Muhammad Saeed.

Contributions
He established Hamdard Public School, New Delhi in 1993. He was instrumental in establishing several academic institutions like Jamia Hamdard, Hamdard National Foundation, Hamdard Education Society, Hamdard Study Circle, Hamdard Public School, Hamdard Institute of Historical Research, Ghalib Academy, Centre for South Asian Studies, and Business and Employment Bureau. 
To continue his philanthropic work he established Hamdard Charitable Trust in 1948 and Hamdard National Foundation in 1964. He was a Unani Physician who established Majeedia Hospital. It is now known as HAH Centenary Hospital (Modern Medicine) and Majeedia Hospital (Unani)

Awards 
Hakeem Abdul Hameed was awarded Padma Shri and Padma Bhushan.  He was awarded the Avicenna award in 1983. In 2000 he was awarded the IRCICA Award for Patronage in Preservation of Cultural Heritage & Promotion of Scholarship by Research Centre for Islamic History, Art and Culture (IRCICA) Istanbul, Turkey.

See also
 Jamia Hamdard
 Hamdard (Wakf) Laboratories
 Aligarh Muslim University

References

Recipients of the Padma Shri in medicine
Recipients of the Padma Bhushan in medicine
1908 births
1999 deaths
Medical doctors from Delhi
20th-century Indian medical doctors
Indian medical academics
20th-century Indian educational theorists
Academic staff of Aligarh Muslim University
Unani practitioners